Tracey Jayne Hallam (born 24 March 1975) is a former English badminton player.

Career
Hallam played badminton at the 2004 Summer Olympics.  In women's singles, she defeated Juliane Schenk of Germany and Camilla Martin of Denmark in the first two rounds.  In the quarterfinals, Hallam lost to Mia Audina of the Netherlands 11–0, 11–9.

At the 1998 Commonwealth Games Hallam won the gold in the women's team event and bronze in the singles event. At the 2002 Commonwealth Games she won the gold in the mixed team event and silver in the singles event. She won gold in the women's singles at the 2006 Commonwealth Games.

She participated in the 2008 Beijing Olympics in the Women's singles event but she was knocked out in the third round by Xu Huaiwen of Germany (21–10, 21–7).

Achievements

Commonwealth Games

Women's singles

World University Championships

Women's doubles

Grand Prix

Women's singles

 BWF Grand Prix tournament

International Challenge/Series/Satellite/European Circuit

Women's singles

External links
 
 Tracey Hallam at BadmintonEngland.co.uk

1975 births
Living people
English female badminton players
Olympic badminton players of Great Britain
Badminton players at the 2004 Summer Olympics
Badminton players at the 2008 Summer Olympics
Commonwealth Games silver medallists for England
Badminton players at the 2006 Commonwealth Games
Sportspeople from Burton upon Trent
Commonwealth Games medallists in badminton
Badminton players at the 2002 Commonwealth Games
Badminton players at the 1998 Commonwealth Games
Medallists at the 1998 Commonwealth Games
Medallists at the 2002 Commonwealth Games
Medallists at the 2006 Commonwealth Games